The Shire of Boyup Brook is a local government area located in the South West region of Western Australia, about  southeast of Perth, the state capital.

History

The Upper Blackwood Road District was gazetted on 17 July 1896. On 1 July 1961, it became the Shire of Upper Blackwood under the Local Government Act 1960 and on 30 May 1969 changed its name to the Shire of Boyup Brook.

Wards
The shire has been divided into 4 wards.

 Boyup Brook Ward (3 councillors)
 Benjinup Ward (2 councillors)
 Dinninup Ward (2 councillors)
 Scotts Brook Ward (2 councillors)

Towns and localities
The towns and localities of the Shire of Boyup Brook with population and size figures based on the most recent Australian census:

Heritage-listed places

As of 2023, 45 places are heritage-listed in the Shire of Boyup Brook, of which one is on the State Register of Heritage Places, the Norlup Homestead. The homestead, dating back to 1872, was added to the register on 24 March 1998.

References

External links
 

Boyup Brook